Aduthila is a village between Ezhome and Madayi Panchayath, in the Indian state of Kerala. Aduthila literally means the nearest home (in Malayalam  means near and  means family or home).

Location
Pazhangaadi provides Aduthila with its nearest post office, bus stand, and railway station. A straight road from Valapattanam Junction to Pazhayangadi leads to Aduthila. Aduthila comprises mainly two major panchayats, Ezhome panjayath and Madayi panjayath.

Temples
Aduthila contains multiple temples but no mosques or churches. Temples at Aduthila include:
 Theru Sree Bhagavathi Kshetram
 Aduthila Sree Deivamiruvar Kshethram
 Paaranthatta Mahavishnu Kshethram

Schools
Education includes an LP school, a UP school at Neruvambram, and HS, higher secondary, and college at Madayi. The EMS memorial library at Aduthila provides a wide range of book collections. It also holds a good educational VCD DVD collection, an IT room.

Sports
Aduthila has a Kolkali team known as Aduthila sree deivamiruvar kshethram kolkkali sangham. This kolkkali team trains children.

The 'Red Stars of Aduthila' is a club known for its volleyball players. GVC Aduthila is a club which holds sports & cultural festivals.

Transportation
The national highway passes through Taliparamba town. Goa and Mumbai can be accessed on the northern side and Cochin and Thiruvananthapuram can be accessed on the southern side. The road to the east of Iritty connects to Mysore and Bangalore.  The nearest railway station is Pazhayangadi on Mangalore-Palakkad line. 
Trains are available to almost all parts of India subject to advance booking over the internet. There are airports at Kannur Mangalore and Calicut. All of them are international airports but direct flights are available only to Middle Eastern countries.

References

Villages near Kannapuram